Pierre Montastruc (17 July 1932 – 25 September 2021) was a French politician. A member of the Union for French Democracy, he served in the National Assembly from 1986 to 1988.

References

1932 births
2021 deaths
Deputies of the 8th National Assembly of the French Fifth Republic
Union for French Democracy politicians